Hibbertia leptopus is a species of flowering plant in the family Dilleniaceae and is endemic to Western Australia. It is an erect shrub with linear leaves and yellow flowers, usually with eleven stamens arranged around the three carpels.

Description
There are usually eleven stamens, some in small groups, arranged around the three glabrous carpels that each contain a single ovule.

Taxonomy
Hibbertia leptopus was first formally described in 1863 George Bentham in Flora Australiensis from specimens collected in the Swan River Colony by James Drummond. The specific epithet (leptopus) means "slender foot", referring to the peduncles.

Distribution and habitat
This hibbertia grows in woodland and heath from near Calingiri to near Goomalling in the Avon Wheatbelt and Jarrah Forest biogeographic regions in the south-west of Western Australia.

Conservation status
Hibbertia leptopus is classified as "Priority Two" by the Western Australian Government Department of Parks and Wildlife meaning that it is poorly known and from only one or a few locations.

See also
List of Hibbertia species

References

leptopus
Flora of Western Australia
Plants described in 1863
Taxa named by George Bentham